Suterilla is a genus of minute operculate snails, marine gastropod mollusks or micromollusks in the family Assimineidae.

Species
Species within the genus Suterilla include:

 Suterilla climoi Fukuda, Ponder & Marshall, 2006
 Suterilla imperforata Fukuda, Ponder & Marshall, 2006
 Suterilla julieae Fukuda, Ponder & Marshall, 2006
 Suterilla neozelanica (Murdoch, 1899) (synonym: Cirsonella neozelanica Murdoch, 1899)

References

+ Fukuda H., Ponder W.F. & Marshall B.A. 2006. Anatomy and relationships of Suterilla Thiele (Caenogastropoda: Assimineidae) with descriptions of four new species. Molluscan Research 26 (3) : 141-168

External links

Assimineidae